The Princess and the Plumber is a 1930 American pre-Code comedy film directed by Alexander Korda and written by Howard J. Green. The film stars Charles Farrell, Maureen O'Sullivan, H. B. Warner, Joseph Cawthorn, Bert Roach and Lucien Prival. The film was released on December 21, 1930, by Fox Film Corporation.

Cast      
Charles Farrell as Charlie Peters/Albert Bowers
Maureen O'Sullivan as Princess Louise
H. B. Warner as Prince Conrad of Daritzia
Joseph Cawthorn as Merkl
Bert Roach as Albert Bowers
Lucien Prival as Baron von Kemper
Murray Kinnell as Worthing
Louise Closser Hale as Miss Eden

References

External links 
 

1930 films
1930 comedy films
American comedy films
1930s English-language films
Fox Film films
Films directed by Alexander Korda
Films set in Europe
American black-and-white films
1930s American films